Peyron may refer to:

Bruno Peyron (born 1955), French yachtsman who broke the outright round-the-world sailing record in March 2005
Gustaf Oscar Peyron (1828–1915), Swedish military officer and politician
Henry Peyron (1883–1972), Swedish fencer
Ika Peyron (1845–1922), Swedish composer and pianist
Jean-François Pierre Peyron (1744–1814), French neoclassical painter
Loïck Peyron (born 1959), French yachtsman, younger brother of the yachtsman Bruno Peyron
Michael Peyron (born 1935), specialist in the field of Berber language, literature and culture
Théophile Peyron, French naval doctor, who ran the mental hospital of Saint-Paul-de Mausole in a former monastery just outside Saint Rémy de Provence
Alexandre Louis François Peyron, Minister of Marine and Colonies (1883–85)

Surnames of French origin